Lucas Cañizares Conchello (born 10 May 2002) is a Spanish professional footballer who plays as a goalkeeper for Real Madrid Castilla. He is a youth international for Spain.

Personal life
Cañizares is the son of the retired footballer Santiago Cañizares.

Career statistics

Club

Honours
Real Madrid
FIFA Club World Cup: 2022

References

External links 

 Real Madrid profile
 
 
 

2002 births
Living people
Footballers from Valencia (city)
Spanish footballers
Association football goalkeepers
Real Madrid Castilla footballers
Real Madrid CF players
Primera Federación players
Spain youth international footballers